Yunnanyi Airport also called Xiangyun Airport is located at west of Xiangyun (Yunnan Province) in the People’s Republic of China. There were two airports be built in Xiangyun during World War II, one called Yunnanyi and another called Beitun. The Yunnanyi Airport has been abandoned since 1949. And Beitun Airport is still used nowadays.

History
During World War II, the airport was known as Yunnani (Siangyun) Airfield and was used by the United States Army Air Forces Fourteenth Air Force as part of the China Defensive Campaign beginning in September 1944.  The airfield was primarily used by transport (C-46 Commando, C-47 Skytrain) squadrons arriving from India after flying over "the Hump".  The transport aircraft unloaded supplies and equipment for the Chinese forces, primarily being food and ammunition.  In addition, USAAF F-4 (P-38 Lightning) aircraft flew combat reconnaissance missions over Japanese-held areas from the airport in late 1944 and early 1945.   The Americans closed their facilities at the airport in July 1945.

References

 
 Maurer, Maurer. Air Force Combat Units Of World War II. Maxwell Air Force Base, Alabama: Office of Air Force History, 1983. 
 Airfields & Seaplane Anchorages China
 USAFHRA history search, Yunnani

Airfields of the United States Army Air Forces in China
Airports in Yunnan
Transport in Dali Bai Autonomous Prefecture